Estha Essombe (born 20 April 1963 in Boulogne-sur-Mer, France) is a French judoka. Essombe competed at the 1996 Summer Olympics in the women's half-heavyweight division.

References

1963 births
Living people
French female judoka
Olympic judoka of France
Judoka at the 1996 Summer Olympics
Mediterranean Games gold medalists for France
Mediterranean Games medalists in judo
Competitors at the 1997 Mediterranean Games
21st-century French women
20th-century French women